Ulysses Fitzmaurice (1744 — 21 Aug 1772) was acting Governor of the Windward Islands 1768–1771.

Early life
Reputed to be the natural son of Right Honorable William FitzMaurice (1694–1747), 2nd Earl of Kerry PC (Ire) was an Irish peer and an officer in the British Army, of Kerry Ireland. His mother was simple recorded as of a German family, and he had half-siblings Aboan, James, Robert and John — all named in his Will and a petition of 23 February 1774.

He died as an illegitimate, bachelor without apparent heirs and intestate however his estate consisted of a four-hundred acre Coffee Plantation Estate, called Bowood in Saint Andrew, Dominica, a small leasehold estate in Kerry, Ireland and a personal estate valued at £3,456.

His brother Aboan Fitzmaurice petitioned for the estate (against the advice of the Earl of Shelburne).

Career
The recorded political career of Lieutenant-Governor of St. Vincent Ulysses Fitzmaurice between 1766 and 1772 seems very short in a period when the Caribbean was in constant turmoil over ownership.

On the 2 December 1766 he was appointed Lieutenant-Governor of St. Vincent, after Lauchlin McLean.

On 26 July 1768, acted as Governor of the Southern Caribbean when both General Robert Melvill and Lieutenant-General Thomas Gore, the Lieutenant-Governor, being absent from the colony.

During early 1769 he attempted to appease a frustrated French Roman Catholic population by appointing several as justice of the peace in each parish, and by 15 April 1771, when Council members were needed, he choose to appoint two French as councillors into the Grenada Assembly.

In June 1769 he had to travel to nearby St Vincent and to report to Earl of Hillsborough back in London about his attempts, with nine companies of the 32nd Regiment, to appease the impending troubles against the British from the hostile Black Caribs.

As Commander-in-Chief in and over his Majesty's Southern Caribbean Islands of Grenada, the Grenadines, St. Vincent, Dominica, and Tobago he then, on 10 June 1769, published a formal proclamation "to preserve the said Caraibes, free mulattoes and free negroes in perfect enjoyment of their freedom".

Fitzmaurice died on 21 August 1772 on the island of Grenada, and Lt. William Leybourne was appointed to act as Governor.

In August 1776 a memorial to the late Ulysses Fitzmaurice, commander in chief of the Southern Caribbean Islands was presented by the trustees of his estate.

References
 

1775 deaths
1744 births